Tishkan is one of the 29 districts of Badakhshan province in eastern Afghanistan.  It was created in 2005 from part of Kishim District and is home to approximately 33,165 residents.

See also
Kishim District

References

External links
Map at the Afghanistan Information Management Services

Districts of Badakhshan Province